is an Echizen Railway Mikuni Awara Line railway station located in the city of Fukui, Fukui Prefecture, Japan.

Lines

Station layout
The station consists of one island platform and one side platform connected by a level crossing. The station is staffed, except for early mornings and late nights. A Keifuku bus stop and a municipal shared-taxi stand provide connecting service.

Adjacent stations

History
Nittazuka Station was opened on December 30, 1928. On September 1, 1942 the Keifuku Electric Railway merged with Mikuni Awara Electric Railway. Operations were halted from June 25, 2001. The station reopened on August 10, 2003 as an Echizen Railway station.

Surrounding area
The station sits in the northwestern part of Fukui's urbanized area; a quiet residential area lies to the west, and a large private hospital and related facilities are just to the east.
Other points of interest include:
Fukui General Clinic
Fukui Nittazuka Post Office
Seiren Co., Ltd. Nitta Plant

See also
 List of railway stations in Japan

External links

  

Railway stations in Fukui Prefecture
Railway stations in Japan opened in 1928
Mikuni Awara Line
Fukui (city)